Occipital cryoneurolysis is a procedure used to treat nerve pain generated by peripheral nerves (nerves located outside of the spinal column and skull) commonly due to the condition occipital neuralgia. A probe (no larger than a small needle) is carefully placed adjacent to the specific nerve. Once in the appropriate area the probe is first used to stimulate the affected nerve helping to verify positioning. The nerve is still functional and returns to its normal (un-frozen) state immediately after the procedure is completed.  
Side effects and adverse reactions are rare. Potential side effects or complications could include soreness from the procedure for a few days, trauma to the nerve, which may cause worsening of the pain or loss of nerve function, as well as infection or bleeding complications.

References

Surgical procedures and techniques